Mount Cartier is a  mountain summit located in British Columbia, Canada.

Description

Mount Cartier is part of the Duncan Ranges which is a subrange of the Selkirk Mountains. Precipitation runoff from the mountain drains west to Arrow Lakes which is a reservoir of the Columbia River. From the lake, a 15-kilometer trail leads to a fire lookout and the upper slopes. The trail and lookout were constructed in the early 1920s, and while the lookout still stands, it hasn't been used for fire detection since the 1930s. The mountain trail is also a helibiking destination with helicopters lifting mountain bikers to a helipad below the summit.

Etymology

The mountain is named after Sir George-Étienne Cartier (1814–1873), Prime Minister of Canada (1858–62). He was born at Antoine, Quebec; served as attorney general for Lower Canada (1856); and as joint Prime Minister with Sir John A. Macdonald. He was a strong advocate for Confederation and expansion in the west. The mountain's toponym was officially adopted September 30, 1932, by the Geographical Names Board of Canada, although this toponym had appeared in publications as early as 1887, if not earlier.

Climate

Based on the Köppen climate classification, Mount Cartier is located in a subarctic climate zone with cold, snowy winters, and mild summers. Winter temperatures can drop below −20 °C with wind chill factors below −30 °C. This climate supports a ski resort  to the north.

See also

Geography of British Columbia

Gallery

References

External links
 Mount Cartier: Weather forecast
 Mount Cartier (photo): Flickr

Two-thousanders of British Columbia
Selkirk Mountains
Columbia Country
Kootenay Land District